Herman L. Page (May 27, 1818 – October 15, 1873) was a merchant and Wisconsin politician. He was born in Oneida County, New York, later moving to Nunda, New York, in Livingston County, New York, in 1844.

Page operated a store in the old Pioneer store, 393 East Water, Milwaukee, Wisconsin.

In 1853 he became sheriff of the county. He was responsible for starting the detective force in the city. During his term as mayor, he advocated the policy of uniforming the police force.

Page was a very able man but was a renegade. He began his career as an abolitionist, but having high political aspirations he took allegiance to the Democratic Party. He was elected mayor of Milwaukee in 1859. He spent most of his short term of office attacking the former administration of William L. Prentiss.

The Twenty-fourth Infantry Regiment, Civil War was recruited under the direction of Lieutenant Colonel Herman L. Page, however, Page resigned before the regiment left the state.

He was an officer in the Odd Fellows, 1851-1853.

Herman Page died while visiting Dresden, Germany in 1873.

References

1818 births
1873 deaths
People from Oneida County, New York
Mayors of Milwaukee
People of Wisconsin in the American Civil War
Businesspeople from Wisconsin
People from Nunda, New York
19th-century American politicians
19th-century American businesspeople